Melinda Vigh (2 May 1982 – 7 August 2021) was a Hungarian climber. A forearm amputee, she competed in the disability group AU2.

Biography
Vigh finished second at the 2016 IFSC Paraclimbing World Championships in Paris and in 2018 in Innsbruck. In the 2019 Briançon competition, she finished third.

Melinda Vigh died from an accidental fall while climbing the Watzmann on 7 August 2021 at the age of 39.

References

1982 births
2021 deaths
Sportspeople from Budapest
Hungarian mountain climbers
Paraclimbers
Female climbers
Mountaineering deaths
Sport deaths in Germany
Hungarian amputees